The Pholidoskepia are one of the three orders of solenogaster.

It is considered an alternate representation for the class Solenogastres.

Taxonomy
 Dondersiidae
 Dondersia
 Heathia
 Helluoherpia
 Ichthyomenia
 Lyratoherpia
 Micromenia
 Nematomenia
 Squamatoherpia
 Stylomenia
 Gymnomeniidae
 Genitoconi
 Gymnomenia
 Wirenia
 Lepidomeniidae
 Lepidomenia
 Nierstraszia
 Tegulaherpia
 Macellomeniidae
 Macellomenia
 Meiomeniidae
 Meioherpia
 Meiomenia
 Sandalomeniidae
 Sandalomenia

References